"Sinéad" is the second single from Within Temptation's fifth studio album, The Unforgiving, released on 15 July 2011. Its release was announced alongside the unveiling of its artwork on 15 April 2011. On 19 May 2011, the band announced that the single would contain special dance remixes, confirming on 10 June that there will be four different versions by Benno de Goeij, Scooter, VNV Nation and Groove Coverage. "Empty Eyes" was the B-side on the five-track maxi CD.

Track listing
Two-track German CD
"Sinéad" (single version) – 3:52
"Sinéad" (Scooter remix) – 3:46

Five-track maxi CD
"Sinéad" (single version) – 3:52
"Empty Eyes" – 3:42
"Sinéad" (VNV Nation remix) – 6:30
"Sinéad" (Scooter remix) – 3:46
"Sinéad" (Groove Coverage remix) – 4:53

Charts

References

2011 singles
2011 songs
Within Temptation songs
Songs written by Sharon den Adel
Songs written by Robert Westerholt
Songs written by Martijn Spierenburg
Roadrunner Records singles